Andrew York (14 June 1894 – 1977) was an English professional footballer who made 147 appearances in the Football League playing for Sunderland, Coventry City, Northampton Town and Lincoln City. He played as a left back.
 
York was born in Blyth, Northumberland. He began his career in local football in his native north-east of England before signing for Sunderland, for whom he played just once in the First Division before moving south to play for Coventry City in the Second Division and for Third Division clubs Northampton Town and Lincoln City. Already well into his thirties when he signed for Lincoln, he found himself playing regular first-team football for the first time in his career – he missed only four matches in his first two seasons – and helped them reach runners-up spot in 1927–28. He made 114 appearances in all competitions for Lincoln before finishing his career in non-league football with Newark Town and Scarborough. He died in 1977.

Notes

References

1894 births
1977 deaths
People from Blyth, Northumberland
Footballers from Northumberland
English footballers
Association football fullbacks
Bedlington United A.F.C. players
Blyth Spartans A.F.C. players
Sunderland A.F.C. players
Coventry City F.C. players
Northampton Town F.C. players
Lincoln City F.C. players
Newark Town F.C. players
Scarborough F.C. players
English Football League players
Date of death missing